The Schleicher K7 Rhönadler is a West German high-wing, two-seat, glider that was designed by Rudolf Kaiser and produced by Alexander Schleicher GmbH & Co.

Often referred to as the Ka-7 or K-7, the US Federal Aviation Administration type certificate officially designates it as the K7.

Design and development
The K7 was intended as a two-place trainer with good performance, a rare combination in trainers of its time.

The K7 is constructed with a welded steel tube fuselage, covered in doped aircraft fabric covering. The wing is a wooden structure with a doped fabric covering and employs a Goettingen 533 (16%) airfoil at the wing root, transitioning to a Goettingen 533 (14%) section at the wing tip. The wing features powerful dive brakes. The landing gear is a fixed monowheel. The earlier Ka-2 variant has a plywood monocoque fuselage.

After 550 had been built, the K7 was superseded in production by the Schleicher ASK 13.

The K7 can be converted into a K7/13 with a conversion kit to lower the wing to the mid-wing position and installation of a one-piece canopy, rendering the aircraft similar to the ASK-13.

Operational history

A K7 was assigned to 2 Wing AAFC and used to train Australian Air Force Cadets 228 Squadron at Bundaberg from 2007 to 2014.

Variants
Ka-2
Early version with a plywood monocoque fuselage
K7
Main production version with a steel tube fuselage.
K7/13
K7 converted to a mid-wing arrangement, plus a single piece canopy, to resemble an AS-K 13

Specifications (K7)

See also

Notes

References

External links

1960s German sailplanes
Schleicher aircraft
High-wing aircraft
Aircraft first flown in 1960